Couts is a surname. Notable people with the surname include:

Kimberly Couts (born 1989), American tennis player
Brandon Couts (born 1979), American sprinter and coach
Mary Couts Burnett, American philanthropist
Cave J. Couts, US Army

See also
Coutts (disambiguation)
Cout